Island Sands (foaled 27 January 1996) was an Irish-bred Thoroughbred racehorse and sire. In a career that lasted from August 1998 to June 2001 he ran nine times and won four races. His most notable success came in his first race as a three-year-old in 1999, when he won the 2,000 Guineas at Newmarket. His subsequent career was restricted by injury and he won only one minor race in the next two years. He retired to a stud career in China.

Background
Island Sands was described as a "most attractive" brown horse with a small white star and four white feet and stood 16 hands high. He was bred at the Kilcoran House Stud in County Tipperary, Ireland by Mrs T. V. Ryan. He was sired by Turtle Island out of the mare Tiavanita. Turtle Island won six races, most notably the 1994 Irish 2,000 Guineas which he won by fifteen lengths on his favoured soft ground. At stud, he has sired the winners of over four hundred races, but Island Sands, from his first crop of foals, remains his only winner at Group One level. Tiavanita failed to win a race but was a half-sister of Corrupt, who won the Great Voltigeur Stakes and started joint-favourite for the 1991 Epsom Derby. As a yearling, Island Sands was sent to the Goffs Sale in October, where he was bought for IR£18,000 by the British trainer David Elsworth.

Racing career

1998: two-year-old season
Island Sands made his first appearance in a six furlong maiden race at Salisbury in August 1998. Ridden by the apprentice jockey Alan Daly, he took the lead in the final furlong and won by two lengths from Victory Spin and twelve other runners. Five weeks later he returned to Salisbury for the Cranbourne Stakes in which he started favourite at odds of 4/6 and won by two lengths from Locombe Hill. After this race he was bought by Godolphin Racing and sent to spend the winter in Dubai, where he was trained by Saeed bin Suroor.

1999: three-year-old season
Early in 1999 Island Sands won a private trial race against other Godolphin horses at Nad Al Sheba, which led to him being aimed at the 2000 Guineas, whilst the Godolphin team's best two-year-old of 1998, Aljabr traveled to the United States for an abortive attempt at the Kentucky Derby.

On 1 May 1999, Island Sands started the 10/1 sixth choice in the betting for the sixteen runner 2000 Guineas. As the Rowley Mile course was being redeveloped, the race was run on the Newmarket July course for the first time since 1945. The field split into two groups, with Island Sands, ridden by Frankie Dettori, leading the larger group on the side of the course further from the stands. Two furlongs from the finish he established an overall lead and ran on well in the closing stages to win by a neck from the strong-finishing Greenham Stakes winner Enrique, with Mujahid third. Dettori explained that he had not intended to make the running but had decided to let the colt go on when he started exceptionally well. Commenting on the finish, he said that he had been worried by Enrique's challenge but that "my fellow ran on really well again". Three weeks later, Island Sands started favourite for the Irish 2000 Guineas at the Curragh, but failed to reproduce his Newmarket form. He was never traveling well and appeared to be struggling three furlongs from the end of the race before finishing fifth of the ten runners, beaten more than seven lengths by the Aidan O'Brien-trained Saffron Walden. An injury then kept him off the racecourse for the remainder of the year.

2000–2001: later career
After a break of fifteen months, Island Sands returned to the racecourse in August 2000 in the Group Three Prix Quincey at Deauville, for which he was made 9/10 favourite. Frankie Dettori attempted to make all the running on the colt, but he was overtaken in the closing stages and beaten one and a half lengths by the three-year-old filly Penny's Gold. A recurrence of his injury problems then ruled him out for the rest of the season.

Island Sands returned as a five-year-old in 2001 and won once from four starts. By this time his ownership had been transferred to Maktoum Al Maktoum and he was trained by David Loder. In March he ran in the Prix Edmond Blanc at Saint-Cloud, and after leading for most of the way, finished second to Golani. In the Group Two Sandown Mile a month later, he led from the start as usual before finishing third to Nicobar and Swalow Flight. For his next appearance, Island Sands was dropped in class to run in a minor stakes race over one mile at Haydock Park Racecourse in May and won by eight lengths at odds of 4/11. He returned to top class racing in the Queen Anne Stakes at Royal Ascot but after leading in the early stages he dropped away to finish last of the ten runners behind Medicean.

Assessment
In the 1999 International Classification, Island Sands was given a rating of 116, a very low mark for a Classic winner, and 19 pounds below the top-rated three-year-old Montjeu. The Racing Post was more generous, giving him a rating of 121.

Stud career
Island Sands was exported to stand as a stallion in China.

Pedigree

References

1996 racehorse births
Racehorses bred in Ireland
Racehorses trained in the United Kingdom
Thoroughbred family 4-r
2000 Guineas winners